The Wagaydyic languages (nowadays more often referred to as the Anson Bay languages) are a pair of closely related but otherwise unclassified Australian Aboriginal languages: the moribund Wadjiginy (also known as Wagaydy and Batjamalh) and the extinct Kandjerramalh (Pungupungu).

Tryon (1980) notes that the two languages are 79% cognate based on a 200-item wordlist, but there are serious grammatical differences that prevent them from being considered dialects of a single language.

The unattested Giyug may have been a dialect of Wadjiginy or otherwise related.

The Wagaydyic languages have previously been classified with Malak-Malak into a Northern Daly family, but similarities appear to be due to lexical and morphological borrowing from Malak-Malak, at least in Wadjiginy.

Vocabulary
The following basic vocabulary items of Wadjiginy and Pungupungu are from Tryon (1968).

{| class="wikitable sortable"
! no. !! gloss !! Wadjiginy !! Pungupungu
|-
| 1 || head || biǰæ || pœǰæ
|-
| 2 || hair || mæræbiǰæ || mæræpœǰæ
|-
| 3 || eyes || mibæ || mibæ
|-
| 4 || nose || wiǰa || wuǰæ
|-
| 5 || ear || bibara || pibæræ
|-
| 6 || tooth || diRæ || diRæ
|-
| 7 || tongue || ŋadal || ŋadal
|-
| 8 || shoulder || čælmæ || čælmæ
|-
| 9 || elbow || čin || čin
|-
| 10 || hand || ŋælæ || ŋælæ
|-
| 11 || breasts || wiŋ || wïŋ
|-
| 12 || back || bæbæra || raɲ
|-
| 13 || belly || dawara || wunæ
|-
| 14 || navel || ǰœrač || čœrač
|-
| 15 || heart || čœnmanaǰ || dœpmadœpma
|-
| 16 || urine || kæwælæč || kawalač
|-
| 17 || excrete || guk || kuk
|-
| 18 || thigh || bælæm || pædlæm
|-
| 19 || leg || kæræl || kæræl
|-
| 20 || knee || karaŋok || miraŋok
|-
| 21 || foot || čœt || čœt
|-
| 22 || skin || yæræɲ || yæræɲ
|-
| 23 || fat || wudæwæl || wœdawæl
|-
| 24 || blood || kawæɲ || kawaɲ
|-
| 25 || bone || bwik || bwik
|-
| 26 || man || ŋanaŋ || ŋanaŋ
|-
| 27 || woman || ŋawolaŋ || ŋawalaŋ
|-
| 28 || father || bapa || papalak
|-
| 29 || mother || kalaŋ || kalaŋ
|-
| 30 || grandmother || makaŋ || æčæ
|-
| 31 || policeman || wænæn || dukmækæ
|-
| 32 || spear || wælæra || wælæræ
|-
| 33 || woomera || kalan || kalan
|-
| 34 || boomerang || wiɲiŋgiɲ || wïɲïŋgïɲ
|-
| 35 || nullanulla || langur || langur
|-
| 36 || hair-belt || bulkaŋ || pulkaŋ
|-
| 37 || canoe || wutïŋge || winæ
|-
| 38 || axe || ličpuruk || ličpurp
|-
| 39 || dilly bag || wargade || waRgade
|-
| 40 || fire || wiɳ || win
|-
| 41 || smoke || wïɳgal || wungæl
|-
| 42 || water || wiyïk || wik
|-
| 43 || cloud || guk || pærk
|-
| 44 || rainbow || banaŋak || pulipuli
|-
| 45 || barramundi || pænŋat || pænŋæt
|-
| 46 || sea || ŋalgïn || ŋalgïn
|-
| 47 || river || čakaR || wikmagat
|-
| 48 || stone || maŋ || maŋ
|-
| 49 || ground || wut || wut
|-
| 50 || track || kal || kæl
|-
| 51 || dust || bœnaŋ || pœnaŋ
|-
| 52 || sun || gæyïk || kayïk
|-
| 53 || moon || kara || kalakkalak
|-
| 54 || star || mœrtæ || mœrta
|-
| 55 || night || ŋuraǰa || ŋurïnǰe
|-
| 56 || tomorrow || yiɲmæk || yiɲmæk
|-
| 57 || today || ŋaR || ŋær
|-
| 58 || big || pamalaŋ || pamalaŋ
|-
| 59 || possum || čædæræč || čaǰɛdač
|-
| 60 || dog || moyiɲ || moyiɲ
|-
| 61 || tail || kalpæ || kælpæ
|-
| 62 || meat || mæǰæm || mæǰæm
|-
| 63 || snake || kulgamalaŋ || walan
|-
| 64 || red kangaroo || muǰ || kænga
|-
| 65 || porcupine || nïminïŋač || mænɛŋɛč
|-
| 66 || emu || ŋœrœn || ŋœrœčul
|-
| 67 || crow || wak || wak
|-
| 68 || goanna || ŋaran || ŋaran
|-
| 69 || blue tongue lizard || bwikmidaŋ || wirič
|-
| 70 || mosquito || wœRaŋ || wœraŋ
|-
| 71 || sugar-bag || činæɲ || činiɲ
|-
| 72 || camp || rak || ræk
|-
| 73 || black || kalalk || kalalk
|-
| 74 || white || baybaymalaŋ || baybaymalaŋ
|-
| 75 || red || wïrewïre || wurewure
|-
| 76 || one || ŋanǰič || ŋanǰič
|-
| 77 || two || bakatamalaŋ || parkataŋgæɲ
|-
| 78 || when? || ænæɲ || anikinæ
|-
| 79 || what? || ɲinič || ɲinič
|-
| 80 || who? || naga || naga
|-
| 81 || I || ŋaǰa || ŋæǰæ
|-
| 82 || you || kænæ || kænæ
|-
| 83 || he || ǰamoyič || čamoyič
|-
| 84 || grass || wœrak || wœrak
|-
| 85 || vegetable food || mænæɲ || mænæɲ
|-
| 86 || tree || wiɳ || wiɳ
|-
| 87 || leaf || kalkal || kalkal
|-
| 88 || pandanus || ɲïŋarač || nurač
|-
| 89 || ironwood || mælæ || mælæ
|-
| 90 || ripe || baramuŋ || paramuŋ
|-
| 91 || good || čarakɔ || čarakɔ
|-
| 92 || bad || čalkma || čalkma
|-
| 93 || blind || kulyuk || kuluk
|-
| 94 || deaf || ŋamama || ŋamama
|-
| 95 || saliva || wudak || wudak
|}

See also
Daly languages

References

 
Language families
Daly languages